The 1871 Invercargill mayoral election was held on 26 August 1871. It was the first mayoral election of the Invercargill municipality.

Former Superintendent of the Southland Province William Wood defeated John Walker Mitchell, becoming the first Mayor of Invercargill.

Results
The following table gives the election results:

References

1871 elections in New Zealand
Mayoral elections in Invercargill